Osage County is a county in the central part of the U.S. state of Missouri. As of the 2020 census, the population was 13,274. Its county seat is Linn. The county was organized January 29, 1841, and named from the Osage River.

Osage County is part of the Jefferson City, MO Metropolitan Statistical Area. Its geography and the founding of Westphalia Vineyards links it to the Missouri Rhineland, extending along the Missouri River valley to the western edges of the St. Louis Metropolitan Area.

According to data from the 2010 census, Osage County is the whitest county in Missouri, with 98.85 percent of residents being white.

Geography

Adjacent counties
Callaway County (north)
Gasconade County (east)
Maries County (south)
Miller County (southwest)
Cole County (west)
Montgomery County (northeast)

Major highways
 U.S. Route 50
 U.S. Route 63
 Route 89
 Route 100
 Route 133

Demographics

As of the census of 2000, there were 13,062 people, 4,922 households, and 3,578 families residing in the county.  The population density was 22 people per square mile (8/km2).  There were 5,904 housing units at an average density of 10 per square mile (4/km2).  The racial makeup of the county was 98.64% White, 0.16% Black or African American, 0.24% Native American, 0.08% Asian, 0.02% Pacific Islander, 0.07% from other races, and 0.80% from two or more races. Approximately 0.59% of the population were Hispanic or Latino of any race.

There were 4,922 households, out of which 34.90% had children under the age of 18 living with them, 61.70% were married couples living together, 6.70% had a female householder with no husband present, and 27.30% were non-families. 23.80% of all households were made up of individuals, and 10.80% had someone living alone who was 65 years of age or older.  The average household size was 2.61 and the average family size was 3.10.

In the county, the population was spread out, with 26.30% under the age of 18, 9.50% from 18 to 24, 27.70% from 25 to 44, 21.70% from 45 to 64, and 14.70% who were 65 years of age or older.  The median age was 36 years. For every 100 females, there were 103.00 males.  For every 100 females age 18 and over, there were 102.50 males.

The median income for a household in the county was $39,565, and the median income for a family was $46,503. Males had a median income of $29,538 versus $22,353 for females. The per capita income for the county was $17,245.  About 5.90% of families and 8.30% of the population were below the poverty line, including 9.00% of those under age 18 and 10.40% of those age 65 or over.

2020 Census

Education

Public schools
Osage County R-I School District – Chamois
Osage County R-I Elementary School (PK-06)
Chamois High School (07-12)
Osage County R-II School District – Linn
Osage County R-II Elementary School (PK-06)
Linn High School (07-12)
Osage County R-III School District – Westphalia
Fatima Elementary School (PK-06)
Fatima High School (07-12)

Private schools
St. Joseph Catholic School – Westphalia (K-09) – Roman Catholic
Immaculate Conception School – Loose Creek (K-09) – Roman Catholic
St. George School – Linn (K-09) – Roman Catholic
Sacred Heart School – Rich Fountain (K-09) – Roman Catholic
Holy Family School – Freeburg (K-09) – Roman Catholic
St. Mary's School – Bonnots Mill (K-09) – Roman Catholic

Post-secondary
State Technical College of Missouri - Linn, Missouri

Public libraries
Osage County Library

Politics

Local
The Republican Party mostly controls politics at the local level in Osage County. Republicans hold over half of the elected positions in the county.

State

Osage County is split between two of the districts that elect members of the Missouri House of Representatives, and both are represented by Republicans.

District 61 — Aaron Griesheimer). Consists of the northern half of the county.

District 62 — Tom Hurst (R- Meta). Consists of Linn and the southern half of the county.

All of Osage County is a part of Missouri's 6th District in the Missouri Senate and is currently represented by Mike Kehoe (R-Jefferson City).

Federal

All of Osage County is included in Missouri's 3rd Congressional District and is currently represented by Blaine Luetkemeyer (R-St. Elizabeth) in the U.S. House of Representatives.

Political culture

Missouri presidential preference primary (2008)

Missouri presidential preference primary (2016)
Donald J. Trump received more votes, a total of 1,316, than any candidate from either party in Osage County during the 2016 presidential primary.

Communities

Cities and Towns
Argyle (a portion of the city extends into Maries County)
Belle (mostly in Maries County)
Bland (mostly in Gasconade County)
Chamois
Freeburg
Linn (county seat)
Meta
Westphalia

Unincorporated Communities

 Aud
 Babbtown
 Bonnots Mill
 Byron
 Cooper Hill
 Crook
 Deer
 Folk
 Frankenstein
 Freedom
 Hope
 Judge
 Koeltztown
 Koenig
 Loose Creek
 Luystown
 Mint Hill
 Potts
 Rich Fountain
 Saint Aubert

See also
National Register of Historic Places listings in Osage County, Missouri
Bonnots Mill Historic District
Chamois Public School
Dauphine Hotel
Huber's Ferry Farmstead Historic District
Osage County Poorhouse
Sacred Heart Catholic Church and Parsonage
St. Joseph Church
Alvah Washington Townley Farmstead Historic District
Dr. Enoch T. and Amy Zewicki House

References

Further reading
 History of Cole, Moniteau, Morgan, Benton, Miller, Maries and Osage counties, Missouri : from the earliest time to the present, including a department devoted to the preservation of sundry personal, business, professional and the private records; besides a valuable fund of notes, original observations, etc. etc. (1889) online

External links
The Osage County Branch of the Missouri River Regional Library
Westphalia Vineyards Official Website
 Digitized 1930 Plat Book of Osage County  from University of Missouri Division of Special Collections, Archives, and Rare Books

 
1841 establishments in Missouri
Missouri placenames of Native American origin
Missouri Rhineland
Jefferson City metropolitan area
Missouri counties on the Missouri River